Aequatorium lepidotum is a species of flowering plant in the family Asteraceae. It is endemic to Ecuador, where it grows in high Andean forest and shrubland.

References

Aequatorium
Endemic flora of Ecuador
Endangered plants
Taxonomy articles created by Polbot